John Bloom (born 12 September 1935) is a British film editor with nearly fifty film credits commencing with the 1960 film, The Impersonator. He is the brother of actress Claire Bloom.

Bloom won the Academy Award for Best Film Editing and the  American Cinema Editors (ACE) Award for Best Edited Feature Film for Gandhi (1982). He was nominated for Academy Awards in 1981 for his work on The French Lieutenant's Woman and in 1985 for A Chorus Line.  He was nominated for the BAFTA Award for Best Editing in 1981 for The French Lieutenant's Woman, in 1982 for Gandhi, and in 1984 for Under Fire (with Mark Conte).

In 1999, the ACE awarded Bloom its Career Achievement Award.

In 2001, he won the Primetime Emmy Award for Outstanding Single-Camera Picture Editing for a Limited Series or Movie for Wit, and, in 2004, the ACE Award for Best Edited Miniseries or Movie for Non-Commercial Television for his work on Angels in America (2003).

Selected filmography 
Georgy Girl (1966), directed by Silvio Narizzano
The Lion in Winter (1968), directed by Anthony Harvey
Travels with My Aunt (1972), directed by George Cukor
The Message (1976), directed by Moustapha Akkad
Who'll Stop the Rain (1978), directed by Karel Reisz
Dracula (1979), directed by John Badham
The French Lieutenant's Woman (1981), directed by Karel Reisz
Gandhi (1982), directed by Richard Attenborough
Betrayal (1983), directed by David Jones
Under Fire (supervising, with Mark Conte) (1983), directed by Roger Spottiswoode
A Chorus Line (1985), directed by Richard Attenborough
Black Widow (1987), directed by Bob Rafelson
Air America (1990), directed by Roger Spottiswoode
Damage (1992), directed by Louis Malle
Nobody's Fool (1994), directed by Robert Benton
The First Wives Club (1996), directed by Hugh Wilson
Wit (2001), directed by Mike Nichols
Angels in America (2003) (2 episodes), directed by Mike Nichols
Notes on a Scandal (2006), directed by Richard Eyre
Charlie Wilson's War (2007), directed by Mike Nichols

References

External links 
 

1935 births
English film editors
English television editors
Best Film Editing Academy Award winners
People from London
Primetime Emmy Award winners
Living people